Fence is an American  print and online literary publication containing both original work and critical and journalistic coverage of what may be largely termed "experimental" or "avant garde" material. Conceived by Rebecca Wolff in 1997 and first printed in Spring 1998 (receiving coverage from Poets & Writers), its editors have included Jonathan Lethem and Ben Marcus (fiction), Matthew Rohrer and Caroline Crumpacker (poetry), and Frances Richard (non-fiction). As of January 1, 2022, poets Emily Wallis Hughes and Jason Zuzga became Editorial Co-directors.

Fence is published biannually. The translator and National Book Award-nominated poet Cole Swensen edits La Presse, an imprint of Fence magazine publishing contemporary French poetry in translation.

Fence's book publishing arm, Fence Books, has printed volumes by a number of younger non-traditional poets. Fence has also joined with McSweeney's, Wave Books and Open City to distribute content at bigsmallpress; it also runs The Constant Critic, an online reviews site. The podcast Fence Sounds is composed of audio adaptations by contributors of their words as published either online or in the print jmagazine.

See also
List of literary magazines

References

Further reading

External links 
 Fence portal for magazine and book publishing
 Fence magazine, latest issue
 Fence Books

Literary magazines published in the United States
Biannual magazines published in the United States
Magazines established in 1998
Magazines published in New York (state)
Mass media in Albany, New York
1998 establishments in New York (state)